"Hard Headed Woman" is a rock and roll song recorded by Elvis Presley and published by Gladys Music, Presley's publishing company, in 1958. It is an American 12-bar blues written by African American songwriter Claude Demetrius. It was most notably recorded as a rock and roll song by Presley as part of the soundtrack for his 1958 motion picture King Creole, and was included on the record album of the same name. The song was also released as a single in both 78 RPM and 45 RPM formats. In 1958 it went to No. 1 on the Billboard charts and went to No.2 for two weeks on the R&B chart.  It became the first rock and roll single to earn the RIAA designation of Gold Record.

It was later recorded by Wanda Jackson on the album "Live At Town Hall Party 1958". "Hard Headed Woman" was also released as a 45 rpm and received substantial airplay in the late 1950s. The singing on the Wanda Jackson version is striking because of its extreme use of vocal fry, making it difficult to tell if the singer is male or female.

Charts

References

1958 singles
Elvis Presley songs
Billboard Hot 100 number-one singles
Songs written by Claude Demetrius
1958 songs
RCA Records singles
Songs written for films